Diving Machine G5 (Chinese: 飛天潛艇G5)is a roller coaster at Janfusun Fancyworld in Taiwan. It was built in 2000 by Swiss manufacturers Bolliger & Mabillard and was the second dive coaster model to be built, the first being Oblivion at Alton Towers in the United Kingdom. It is located in the Sky Plaza section of the park. It is a nearly mirror image of Oblivion.

Diving Machine G5 is dubbed after the amount of g-forces it creates when it goes through the drop hole. Like Insane Speed, Diving Machine G5 is not themed to anything. Along with the Ku Ku Roller Coaster, and Insane Speed, Diving Machine G5 is one of the three roller coasters at the park.

Diving Machine G5 is the closest ride to the entrance, thus it has long lines in the morning and short waits in the afternoons and nights.

Ride experience
Diving Machine G5 starts right out of the station and engages the lift chain which slowly takes them up the 45-degree angle lift hill to a dizzying height. The train then makes a turn to the right and brakes violently. Riders then hear a small click and slow down as they engage the holding brake and stop right on the edge. After the car completely stops, three seconds pass before the car is released down the 87.5 degree drop and under a bridge into the tunnel, where riders experience a blast of air and 5 g-forces. After exiting the tunnel, riders traverse a massive overbanked turn to the right, drop slightly, then are treated to a burst of airtime as they dip and rise into the final brake run, just as the camera flash goes off. The ride's layout is a nearly mirror image of Oblivion at Alton Towers.

Dive Coasters manufactured by Bolliger & Mabillard
Janfusun Fancyworld
Roller coasters in Taiwan
Roller coasters introduced in 2000